Emily Winterburn is a British science writer, physicist and historian of science based in Yorkshire. She is a visiting Fellow at the University of Leeds. Among other books, she wrote The Quiet Revolution of Caroline Herschel, published by The History Press in 2017.

Early life and education 
Winterburn studied physics at the University of Manchester. She remained there to complete a Masters in the History of Science, focussing on Ernest Rutherford and the Manchester physics department between 1907 and 1919.

Career 
Winterburn joined the Royal Observatory, Greenwich, as a curator looking after astrophysical objects collected from 1250 to the present day. Whilst at the Royal Observatory, Winterburn published The Astronomers Royal. She appeared on Melvyn Bragg's In Our Time in 2007, discussing optics. Alongside curating, Winterburn began a PhD at Imperial College London, studying the Herschel family. In 2011 she submitted her PhD thesis, The Herschels: a scientific family in training. Her thesis was well received by the historical science communities.

In 2009 Winterburn joined the University of Leeds Museum of Science as a curator. That year she published The Stargazer's Guide: How to Read Our Night Sky with HarperCollins. Winterburn is an expert on the Herschel family and Islamic astronomical instruments.  She won the 2014 Notes & Records of the Royal Society essay prize for her essay Philomaths, Herschel, and the myth of the self-taught man. She was part of the 2015 Royal Society celebration for International Women's Day, where she discussed girls' participation in scientific education and society. She contributed to the Springer Publishing book The Scientific Legacy of William Herschel. Winterburn has also written for popular periodicals, including Astronomy Now magazine.

Having published extensively on the Herschel family, Winterburn began to write The Quiet Revolution of Caroline Herschel in 2012. The Quiet Revolution of Caroline Herschel focuses on the ten most productive years of Caroline Herschel's academic career, working with her brother William Herschel's telescope and finding comets. The book was published in 2017 and has been described as a "terrific read".

Books 
 2005 The Astronomers Royal
 2009 The Stargazer's Guide: How to Read Our Night Sky
 2017 The Quiet Revolution of Caroline Herschel: the Lost Heroine of Astronomy

References 

Living people
Science writers
English science writers
Historians of science
English women physicists
English physicists
Alumni of the University of Manchester
Alumni of Imperial College London
Academics of the University of Leeds
Women science writers
Year of birth missing (living people)